Rangitata may refer to:

 Rangitata (hamlet), a settlement in Canterbury, New Zealand
 Rangitata (New Zealand electorate), a parliamentary electorate in Canterbury, New Zealand
 Rangitata Gorge, South Island, New Zealand
 Rangitata orogeny, a long period of uplift and collision in New Zealand
 Rangitata River, a river in Canterbury, New Zealand
 Rangitata Island, an island in the Rangitata River delta
 Rangitata Island Aerodrome, an airfield on Rangitata Island
 Rangitata (spider), a genus of spiders
 RMS Rangitata (1929–1962), an ocean passenger liner